Lucas Matías Suárez Scalarea (born 17 March 1995) is an Argentine footballer who plays as a left-back for Talleres, on loan from Estudiantes RC.

Career

Club
Suárez began his senior career in 2014 with Quilmes, after youth spells with them and Rosario Central. His professional debut arrived on 17 March 2014 in a 1–0 defeat to Lanús. Seven more appearances followed throughout 2013–14, prior to ten in 2014 and seven in 2015. In 2015, Suárez scored his first senior goal during a 2–1 victory over Vélez Sarsfield on 15 March. In the following season, 2016, he made just one appearance for Quilmes before departing the club to join fellow Primera División team Sarmiento. He made his debut for Sarmiento in December 2016 in a win away to former club Quilmes.

Three more appearances came during 2016–17. Ahead of the 2017–18 Argentine Primera División season, Suárez joined Defensa y Justicia. After being an unused substitute in a 4–4 draw against Gimnasia y Esgrima on 26 August 2017, he made his Defensa y Justicia debut on 24 September in a loss against Colón. That turned out to be his only match for the club as he departed in December 2017. He subsequently joined Torneo Federal A side Estudiantes in February 2018.

In February 2021, Suárez was loaned out to Arsenal de Sarandí until the end of the year. In January 2022, the loan deal was extended for one further year. The spell was cut short, and Suárez instead joined Talleres on 12 July 2022 on loan until the end of 2023 with a purchase option.

International
Suárez was called up to represent the Argentina U20s at the 2015 FIFA U-20 World Cup in New Zealand. He played in Group B matches against Panama and Ghana as Argentina failed to reach the knockout stages.

Career statistics
.

References

External links

1995 births
Living people
People from Río Cuarto, Córdoba
Argentine footballers
Argentina youth international footballers
Argentina under-20 international footballers
Association football defenders
Argentine Primera División players
Torneo Federal A players
Quilmes Atlético Club footballers
Club Atlético Sarmiento footballers
Defensa y Justicia footballers
Estudiantes de Río Cuarto footballers
Arsenal de Sarandí footballers
Talleres de Córdoba footballers
Sportspeople from Córdoba Province, Argentina